A blessing is a type of religious pronouncement.

Blessing or Blessings may also refer to:

Religion
 Blessing (Roman Catholic Church), a rite by which persons or things are sanctified as dedicated to divine service
 Apostolic Blessing, a blessing imparted by the Pope

Entertainment

Fiction, film, TV
 Blessings (film), a 2003 television drama film directed by Arvin Brown
 Blessings (TV series), a 2014 Singaporean television series
 The Blessing (novel), a novel by Nancy Mitford
 The Blessing (play), an off Broadway play of 1989 featuring Louisa Horton

Music
 "Blessings" (Big Sean song), a 2015 song by Big Sean from the album Dark Sky Paradise
 Blessings (Futuristic album), a 2017 album by Futuristic
 "Blessings" (Lecrae song), a 2017 song by Christian rapper Lecrae featuring Ty Dolla $ign
 Blessings (Laura Story album), a 2011 album by Laura Story
Blessings (Laura Story song)
 Blessings (Sublime with Rome album), a 2019 album by Sublime with Rome
 "The Blessing" (Yoasobi song), a 2022 song by Yoasobi
 "Blessings", a 1987 song by Gavin Friday and Simon Carmody
 "Blessings", a 2016 song by Chance the Rapper from the mixtape Coloring Book
 "Blessings", a 2016 song by Rich the Kid from the mixtape Keep Flexin
 "Blessings" (Florida Georgia Line song), 2019
 The Blessing (rock band), a former British rock band

Places
 Blessing, Texas, United States
 Blessing, United States Virgin Islands
 Blessing, Virginia, United States

Other
 Blessing (name)
 "Blessing" (poem), a poem by Imtiaz Dharker
 E. K. Blessing, a manufacturer of musical instruments
 Hotel Blessing, an historic hotel in Blessing, Texas, United States
 Blessing, a ship of the Third Supply fleet to Virginia colony in 1609
 Blessing of the Bay, built 1631, one of the first ships constructed in Colonial America

See also
 Bless (disambiguation)
 Blessed (disambiguation)
 The Blessing (disambiguation)